Venning Park is a park in Arcadia, Pretoria, South Africa. The three-hectare park is formally laid out with a sunken garden on the western side of the park and a tea garden, the Heavenly Rose Café, in the middle. The park also features a date palm-lined path and rose gardens on the eastern side near the American Embassy and the Indian High Commission. Annuals are regularly planted on a site between the busy arteries of Pretorius and Schoeman Streets and quieter Eastwood and Farenden Streets.

History 
The park is named after John Harold Venning, former Municipal Parks Director of the city, who retired in 1940.

References 

Parks in Pretoria